The vehicle registration plates of Niger is a legal form requiring the citizens of Niger to have the car registered.

Regular license plates

License plate Niger with European shape and size. The current scheme of regular license plates for private vehicles Niger introduced in 2005. It has 1A2345 format, where 1 - the area code, A - Series, 2345 - number. Regular plates have a white background with black signs. At the right side of the plate are image maps of the country in the colors of the national flag or a simple black silhouette of the country, under which the code has RN. There is a two-line version of license plates. License plate for motorcycles format: A1 / 2345 where A - Series 1 - a region code 2345 - number.

Regional coding

In Niger, there are 8 regions.

1 - Agadez
2 - Diffa
3 - Dosso
4 - Maradi
5 - Tahoua
6 - Tillabéri
7 - Zinder
8 - Niamey

Other formats

Commercial vehicles

Commercial vehicles have license plates with red symbols on an orange background. Format registration marks are similar to regular.

State transport

The government should state license plates 12345ARN6 format, where 12345 - the number, ARN - pointer "Administration of the Republic of Niger," 6 - area code. The plates have a white background and blue characters.

Military transport

The license plate on military units have 12345 format, black background and white characters. In the left side of the image plate located state flag. Often the license plates painted just paint on the vehicle body elements military.

Diplomatic license plates

License plates of higher officials of diplomatic missions have orange symbols on a green background and format 123CMD RN, where 123 - country code, CMD - pointer as chairman of the diplomatic mission, RN - the index of the Republic of Niger.

Other diplomatic vehicles

License plates of other officials of diplomatic missions have orange symbols on a green background and format 123CD4 RN, where 123 - country code, CD - post pointer diplomatic staff, 4 - room, RN - the index of the Republic of Niger.

References

External links
 Vehicle registration plates of Niger

Niger